The Strategic Automated Command and Control System (SACCS) is a United States Strategic Command command and control system to coordinate the operational functions of United States nuclear forces (ICBMs, nuclear bombers, and SLBMs).

Background
The ITT 465L Strategic Air Command Control System (SACCS) with its IBM AN/FSQ-31 SAC Data Processing Systems attained operational capability on January 1, 1968; and its gradual replacement began on October 6, 1975, when the SACCS original IBM 4020 Military Computers were replaced by Honeywell 6080 computers (remaining FSQ-31 components were entirely decommissioned in November.)  The Strategic Air Command Digital Information Network was deployed to replace SACCS' "Data Transmission Subsystem and part of the Data Display Subsystem", e.g., on November 5, 1986, "Martin Marietta Corporation technicians began installing SAC Digital Network (SACDIN) equipment in 91st Strategic Missile Wing missile launch control centers (i.e., either a HUTE rack or MBCP rack).   On February 20, 1987, "SAC declared initial operational capability for the SAC Digital Network when [it] operated successfully between the Headquarters SAC Command Center and the 55th Strategic Reconnaissance Wing Command Post, both located at Offutt AFB, Nebraska, and the 351st Strategic Missile Wing Command Post at Whiteman AFB, Missouri."  SACDIN eventually "linked 135 locations and permitted two-way message communications with ICBM launch control centers for the first time," and the Ground Wave Emergency Network communication system had a Final Environmental Impact Statement issued in September 1987.

SAC Automated Command and Control System
In 1990 when the 465L System had been entirely replaced by the "SAC Auto Cmd/Ctl Sys" for several years, the former SAC C2 system continued using that name as part (except for the SACCS Data Processing System) of "USSTRATCOM Command and Control" (PE 0101316F).  By 1995, the "emergency war order (EWO) communication systems consist[ed] of the primary alert system (PAS), SAC digital network (SACDIN), Survivable Low Frequency Communications System (SLFCS), Air Force Satellite Communications System (AFSATCOM), [ICBM] Super High Frequency Satellite Terminal (ISST) and [UHF] voice radio communication systems"  The USSTRATCOM SACCS was redesignated Strategic Automated Command and Control System with the same acronym on tbd\  and by 2011, the Minimum Essential Emergency Communications Network was being modernized in the Nuclear Command and Control System.  By February 2012, USSTRATCOM was using the Integrated Strategic Planning and Analysis Network (ISPAN), and the USSTRATCOM Replacement Facility Fit-Out (PE 0303255F) was to "include secure HEMP-Shielded Command and Control Center, mainframe computer data centers, multiple 24/7 mission operations centers, storage and maintenance areas, labs/workrooms, back-up generators, Uninterruptible Power Source, Technical Control Facility, Fiber Ring, [with funding] beginning in FY13."

Age of system and planned replacement
A Government Accountability Office report on aging and outdated "legacy systems" used by the federal government published in 2016 noted that the SACCS was one of the oldest federal IT investments, running on 1970s-era IBM Series/1 software and 8-inch floppy disks. The report noted that the Department of Defense "plans to update its data storage solutions, port expansion processors, portable terminals, and desktop terminals by the end of fiscal year 2017."

References

Strategic Air Command command and control systems